Hydnellum caeruleum is an inedible fungus found in North America, Europe, and temperate areas of Asia. Its common names include blue-green hydnellum, blue spine, blue tooth, and bluish tooth.

The young caps have shades of blue, gray and brown, with light blue near the margin. The stem is orange to brown. The flesh is blue to black in the cap, and red to brownish in the stem. The blue hues tend to fade with age.

H. aurantiacum is very similar to mature specimens but differs in color. H. suaveolens is similar, with mostly blue flesh and odour of anise.

Ecology
Hydnellum caeruleum is mycorrhizal and often found in the humus beneath conifer trees.

References

External links
Index Fungorum synonyms
Tom Volk's Fungus of the Month pictures and more information
healing-Mushrooms.net description, bioactive compounds and medicinal properties

Inedible fungi
caeruleum
Fungi of Europe